Villarrealia is a genus of flowering plants belonging to the family Apiaceae.

Its native range is Mexico.

Species:
 Villarrealia calcicola (Mathias & Constance) G.L.Nesom

References

Apiaceae
Apiaceae genera